Shay Rei Shu Maung  (born 27 August 1952) is a Burmese politician who currently serves as a House of Nationalities member of parliament for Kayah State № 2 constituency .

Early life and education
He was born on 27 August 1952 in Demoso, Kayah State, Burma(Myanmar).

Political career
He is a member of the National League for Democracy. In the Myanmar general election, 2015, he was elected as an Amyotha Hluttaw MP, winning a majority of 14087 votes and elected representative from Kayah State № 2 parliamentary constituency  .

He also serves as a member of Amyotha Hluttaw Local and International Non-Government Organizations Committee.

References

National League for Democracy politicians
1952 births
Living people
People from Kayah State